Hood is a census-designated place in Sacramento County, California, United States. Hood has a post office with ZIP code 95639 that was established in 1912. The community was named in 1910 after William Hood, chief engineer of the Southern Pacific Railroad. The population was 271 at the 2010 census.

Geography
According to the United States Census Bureau, the CDP covers an area of 0.3 square miles (0.8 km2), all of it land.

Demographics

The 2010 United States Census reported that Hood had a population of 271. The racial makeup of Hood was 135 (49.8%) White, 0 (0.0%) African American, 15 (5.5%) Native American, 15 (5.5%) Asian, 1 (0.4%) Pacific Islander, 70 (25.8%) from other races, and 35 (12.9%) from two or more races. Hispanic or Latino American of any race were 137 persons (50.6%).

The Census reported that 271 people (100% of the population) lived in households, 0 (0%) lived in non-institutionalized group quarters, and 0 (0%) were institutionalized.

There were 104 households, out of which 34 (32.7%) had children under the age of 18 living in them, 42 (40.4%) were opposite-sex married couples living together, 20 (19.2%) had a female householder with no husband present, 5 (4.8%) had a male householder with no wife present. There were 8 (7.7%) unmarried opposite-sex partnerships, and 0 (0%) same-sex married couples or partnerships. 29 households (27.9%) were made up of individuals, and 8 (7.7%) had someone living alone who was 65 years of age or older. The average household size was 2.61. There were 67 families (64.4% of all households); the average family size was 3.30.

The population was spread out, with 63 people (23.2%) under the age of 18, 18 people (6.6%) aged 18 to 24, 61 people (22.5%) aged 25 to 44, 94 people (34.7%) aged 45 to 64, and 35 people (12.9%) who were 65 years of age or older. The median age was 44.1 years. For every 100 females, there were 96.4 males. For every 100 females age 18 and over, there were 96.2 males.

The homeowner vacancy rate was 0%; the rental vacancy rate was 5.3%. 177 people (65.3% of the population) lived in owner-occupied housing units and 94 people (34.7%) lived in rental housing units.

See also
List of places in California (H)#Ho

References

Census-designated places in Sacramento County, California
Census-designated places in California
Populated places on the Sacramento River